Robert Earl Ferguson (August 5, 1924 – October 3, 2016) was an American politician. He served as lieutenant governor from 1975 to 1979, under Governor Jerry Apodaca. He was an alumnus of Baylor University. Ferguson also was a New Mexico State Senator until his election in 1974 as Lieutenant Governor. He died in October 2016 at the age of 92.

References

1924 births
2016 deaths
Baylor University alumni
Businesspeople from New Mexico
Lieutenant Governors of New Mexico
Democratic Party New Mexico state senators
People from Artesia, New Mexico
People from Pineland, Texas
20th-century American businesspeople